Decker is an American comedy web series & television series created by Tim Heidecker and Gregg Turkington. The show is a web spinoff/tie-in to the series On Cinema at the Cinema on July 17, 2014. Recurring jokes and the personas and mutual antipathies expressed by Decker and Turkington carry over from the relationship of the "real" actors in On Cinema. Season 4 and onwards is aired on TV via Adult Swim.

Series overview

Episodes

Season 1: Classified (2014)

Season 2: Port of Call: Hawaii (2015)

Season 3: Gregg Turkington's Decker Vs. Dracula (2015)

Specials (2015)

Season 4: Unclassified (2016)

Season 5: Unsealed (2017)

Season 6: Mindwipe (2017)

Special (2020)

References

External links

Decker web series episodes at YouTube

Lists of American comedy television series episodes